Galadra is a monotypic moth genus of the family Crambidae described by Francis Walker in 1865. It contains only one species, Galadra rhomboidata, described by the same author in the same year, which is found in New Guinea.

References

Acentropinae
Monotypic moth genera
Moths of New Guinea
Crambidae genera
Taxa named by Francis Walker (entomologist)